William 'Bill' John Maidlow (born 15 July 1949) is an English former first-class cricketer.

Maidlow was born at Bristol in July 1949. He was educated at Malvern College, before going up to Brasenose College, Oxford. While studying at Oxford, he made two appearances in first-class cricket for Oxford University at Oxford in 1972, against Nottinghamshire and Essex. He scored 53 runs in his two matches, with a high score of 45.

References

External links

1949 births
Living people
Cricketers from Bristol
People educated at Malvern College
Alumni of Brasenose College, Oxford
English cricketers
Oxford University cricketers